Zone Fighter, known in Japan as , is a tokusatsu science fiction superhero television series. Produced by Toho Company Ltd., the show aired on Nippon Television from April 2 to September 24, 1973, with a total of 26 episodes. This was Toho's answer to not only the popular Ultra Series, but the Henshin Hero phenomenon started by shows like Kamen Rider and Android Kikaider. The previous year, Toho had just made their first successful superhero show, Rainbowman. The series was also notable for its guest appearances by Toho's own Godzilla, as well as two other Toho monsters, King Ghidorah and Gigan. Supplementary materials published by Toho have confirmed Zone Fighter to be part of the Showa era of the Godzilla series, taking place in between Godzilla vs. Megalon and Godzilla vs. Mechagodzilla.

Characters

Sakimori/Zone family
The Sakimori/Zone family resembles a normal Japanese family, but they are an alien family that came to Earth after their home planet, Peaceland, was destroyed by the evil aliens called the Garogans. To stop the Garogan army's invasion on Earth, the Sakimori family's three children, Hikaru (the oldest son), Hotaru (the teenage sister) and Akira (the youngest son) transform into the superheroes Zone Fighter, Zone Angel, and Zone Junior. Their transformation code (associated with a "henshin" pose) is "Zone Fight Power".

 Hikaru Sakimori/Zone Fighter is the oldest of the siblings. He works as a test driver for cars. Upon uttering the command "Zone Double Fight," Zone Fighter can also grow to giant size (with a streamlined metallic head) to fight the Garogas' Terro-Beasts. His killing attacks are the "Meteor Missile Might", where he shoots a monster with missiles mounted on his wrists, and the "Meteor Proton Beam" fires from his head crest to destroy tougher monsters. Just like Ultraman, he can only become giant-sized for a limited time, and the meter light on his belt buckle changes from blue (normal) to yellow (caution) to red (danger). He was played by Kazuya Aoyama.
 Hotaru Sakimori/Zone Angel is the second oldest of the siblings. She attends high school. She was played by Kazumi Kitahara.
 Akira Sakimori/Zone Junior is the youngest of the siblings. He attends grade school. He was played by Kenji Sato.
 Yoichiro Sakimori is the father of the three children. He is the proprietor of the Toy Research Institute, which explains the family's penchant for toys. He invents the gadgets and vehicles used by the Zone siblings to fight the Garogan army. He was played by Shoji Nakayama.
 Tsukiko Sakimori is Yoichiro's wife and the mother of the three children. She was played by Sachiko Kozuki.
 Raita Sakimori/Zone Great is Yôichirô's father and the grandfather of the three children. When his grandchildren are in a terrible predicament, he uses the Great Raideki satellite to get them out of trouble. He was played by Shiro Amakusa.
 Godzilla, the King of the Monsters himself, is Zone Fighter's occasional ally in fighting the Garogan Terro-Beasts. He is usually called forth by the Zone Family to assist Zone Fighter when he is outmatched or injured and as the series progresses, he becomes a close friend to Zone Fighter. The Zone Family even built a "Godzilla Cave" for the mutant dinosaur to live in and come out of when needed for an emergency (however, he was seen using it only in episode 21). Godzilla appeared in Episodes 4, 11, 15, 21 and 25 in the series. He was played by Toru Kawai and Isao Zushi. Zushi would play Godzilla next in 1974's Godzilla vs. Mechagodzilla in 1974 and Kawai would play Godzilla next in 1975's Terror of Mechagodzilla.

Zone arsenal
 Mighty Liner is Zone Fighter's car. Transforms from his racecar Skyline GT. It can also fly.
 Smokey is the mini-aircraft Zone Angel and Junior ride. So named because it resides in a cloud until called upon. Zone Angel and Junior can recharge Fighter's energy with an emergency battery that comes with the aircraft.
 Bolt Thunder/Great Raideki is the cloud-controlled by Raita Sakamori from the control panel in the family's house. Shoots destructive lightning bolts that can damage a Terro-Beast.

Garogan army
The Garogas are a race of space aliens from the planet Garoga. They have red, black, blue and yellow bodies, along with the same colors for the eyes, faces and floppy antennae. They operate on a huge satellite in space.

 Gold Garoga - He is the leader of the Garogan army. He wears a cape to signify his authority. He is sometimes known as "Baron Garoga." He was voiced by Munemarou Kouda, who would later play Dr. Man in the 1984 sentai series Choudenshi Bioman and Gorma Emperor XV in the 1993 sentai Series Gosei Sentai Dairanger.
 Silver Garogas - They are the Garogan henchmen.
 Red Garogas - They are the Garogan generals. When there is a pack of henchmen, they act as the leaders of the packs.
 White Garogas - They are the Garogan scientists. They create the Terro-Beasts that fight Zone Fighter.
 Garogan X-Agents - They are a squadron of Garogas that were highly trained for any situation. They were the last weapons sent to kill Zone Fighter. During the series finale, they merge to create the monster Grotogauros.
 Terro-Beasts are the various giant monsters sent by the Garogan army to attack the Earth. They are sent in various ways:
 They are launched to Earth from the Garogan satellite via a Terro-Beast missile.
 A Garoga transforms into a Terro-Beast while spying on Earth.
 A certain group of Garogas can merge to become Terro-Beasts in desperate times.

Terro-Beasts
 Red Spark (episode 1)
 Jikiro (episodes 1, 22 and 25)
 Destro-King (episodes 2 and 12)
 Dorola (episode 3)
 Wagilar (episode 4)
 Spyler (episodes 4 and 12)
 Dragon King (episodes 7 and 12)
 Gilmoras (episode 7)
 Gellderah (episode 8)
 Garoga Spider (episode 9)
 Goro-Gorilla (episode 9)
 Spider Uros (episodes 9 and 25)
 Jipudoro (episode 10)
 Shadorah (episode 10)
 Barakidon (episode 12)
 Garoborg (episodes 13 and 25)
 Dedragon (episode 14)
 Zandolla (episode 15)
 Moguranda (episodes 16 and 25)
 Barugas (episode 17)
 Gondargilas (episodes 18 and 19)
 Goramu (episode 20)
 Jellar (episode 21)
 Kastam-Jellar (episode 21)
 Bakugon (episode 23)
 Needlar (episode 24)
 Kabutoji (episode 25)
 Grotogauros (episode 26)
 King Ghidorah appeared in episodes 5 and 6. In these appearances, the space dragon was discovered being controlled by the Garogas. He is also the only monster in the series (excluding Godzilla) that wasn’t killed.
 Gigan appeared in episode 11. The cyborg had lost the ability to fly or use his buzzsaw, but had been given the power to cause explosions with his hooks. He fought and was briefly defeated by Godzilla, but after reviving, he was killed by Zone Fighter at the end of the episode.

Cast 

Hikaru Sakimori / Zone Fighter: Kazuya Aoyama
Hotaru Sakimori / Zone Angel: Kazumi Kitahara
Akira Sakimori / Zone Junior: Takashi Sato
Yoichiro Sakimori / Zone Father: Shoji Nakayama
Tsukiko Sakimori / Zone Mother: Sachiko Kozuki 
Raita Sakimori / Zone Great: Shiro Amagusa 
Takeru Jo: Hideaki Ohara
Voice of Gold Garoga: Munemaru Koda
Zone Fighter (giant): Momoru Kusumi
Garoga, Zone Fighter (life-size, dubbed) : Tatsumi Nikamoto
Godzilla: Toru Kawai, Isao Zushi
 Gigan, King Ghidorah, Terror-Beasts: Isao Zushi
Narrator: Kiyoshi Kobayashi

External links
 An indepth article about the series

Tokusatsu television series
1973 Japanese television series debuts
1973 Japanese television series endings
Godzilla television series
Nippon TV original programming
Toho tokusatsu